56th Division may refer to:

Infantry divisions:
 56th Infantry Division (France), a unit of the French Army in both World Wars
 56th Infantry Division (German Empire), a unit of the Imperial German Army
 56th Infantry Division (Wehrmacht), a unit of the German Army in World War II
 56th Division (Imperial Japanese Army), a unit of the Imperial Japanese Army
 56th (London) Infantry Division, a unit of the British Army
 56th Infantry Division Casale, a unit of the Kingdom of Italy in World War II
 56th Infantry Division (Russian Empire)
 56th Rifle Division (Soviet Union)
 56th Guards Rifle Division (Soviet Union)
 56th Division (Spain), a Spanish Republican unit

See also 
 56th Brigade (disambiguation)
 56th Group (disambiguation)
 56th Regiment (disambiguation)
 56th Squadron (disambiguation)
 56 (Olpherts) Battery Royal Artillery